Buckhorn Township (also designated Township 3) is one of twenty townships within Wake County, North Carolina,  United States. As of the 2010 census, Buckhorn Township had a population of 3,251.

Buckhorn Township, occupying  in southwestern Wake County, includes small portions of the towns of Apex and Holly Springs.

See also 
 Buckhorn Township, Harnett County, North Carolina

References

Townships in Wake County, North Carolina
Townships in North Carolina